Girlfriends' Guide to Divorce in an American drama television series on Bravo. It was developed by Marti Noxon and based on the Girlfriend's Guide book series by Vicki Iovine. The series premiered on December 2, 2014.  The show was renewed for a second season which premiered on December 1, 2015. It is Bravo's first original scripted series.

On April 13, 2016, Bravo renewed the show for three more seasons. Season three began on January 11, 2017. Season four began on August 17, 2017. The fifth and final season premiered on June 14, 2018.

Series overview

Episodes

Season 1 (2014–15)

Season 2 (2015–16)

Season 3 (2017)

Season 4 (2017)

Season 5 (2018)

References

Lists of American comedy-drama television series episodes